Boeotus of Sicyon was an ancient Greek athlete listed by Eusebius of Caesarea as a victor in the stadion race of the 164th Olympiad (124 BC).

References

See also 
Olympic winners of the Stadion race

Ancient Olympic competitors
Ancient Achaean athletes
2nd-century BC Greek people
Ancient Sicyonians
Sicyon